Desmond Sim Kim Jin (born 1961) is a Singaporean playwright, poet, short story writer, screenwriter and painter. His work, Places Where I've Been, won a Merit Prize in the 1993 Singapore Literature Prize for Poetry.

Career
Almost all of his 30 plays to date have been performed in professional theatres in Singapore, Malaysia and the United States. He was TheatreWorks' first playwright-in-residence and has been the associate artistic director of ACTION Theatre since April 2004, running Singapore Theatre Oasis, an incubator programme for new and existing Singaporean playwrights. He has participated in the Shanghai Literary Festival and was awarded a Fulbright fellowship. Desmond has also co-written two movies: Beautiful Boxer (2003) and The Wedding Game (2009). He is an acknowledged Peranakan painter who has held more than a dozen exhibitions on Peranakan figurative themes. Desmond also teaches playwriting, branding, marketing and communications at Temasek Polytechnic School of Design and Lasalle College of the Arts.

Selected plays
1992: Blood and Snow
1993: Sammy Won't Go to School
1993: Elizabeth by Night
1994: Drunken Prawns and Other Edible Delights
1994: A Singapore Carol
1995: Corporate Animals
1995: Teochew Porridge
1996: Who's Afraid of Chow Yuen Fatt?
1998: Drift
1999: Shrimps in Space
1999, 2000: The Swimming Instructor
2001: Autumn Tomyum
2002: MRT
2004: Hubbies4hire
2006: Fairy Godfather
2007: Postcards from Rosa
2009: Wife #11
2010: Perfecting Pratas

Publications
Mistress and Other Creative Takeoffs (1990, Landmark Books)
Co-author with Ovidia Yu and Kwuan Loh
Places Where I've Been (1994, EPB Publishers)
Poetry
Student Plays (Epigram Books, 2013)
Contents: Drunken Prawns, MRT, Perfecting Pratas, The Chair, Shrimps in Space, Teochew Porridge, The Durian Man and His Daughters
Six Plays (Epigram Books, 2013)
Contents: Autumn Tomyam, Elizabeth by Night, Fairy Godfather, Postcards from Rosa, Wife #11, The Swimming Instructor

Painting
 In the Peranakan-styled art that he is now best known for, Desmond is totally self-taught, although a strong influence from Modigliani, Rousseau, de Lempicka and Art Deco is prevalent.

References

External links

1961 births
Living people
Peranakan people in Singapore
Singaporean dramatists and playwrights
Singaporean screenwriters
Singaporean poets
Singapore Literature Prize winners
Singaporean painters